Khairo is a town in the Sindh province of Pakistan. It is located at 26°35'25N 67°42'45E with an altitude of 17 metres (59 feet).

References

Populated places in Sindh